Mónica Cruz Sánchez (born 16 March 1977) is a Spanish actress and dancer. She is the younger sister of actress Penélope Cruz. She has appeared in the films The Inquiry (2006), Last Hour (2008), Jerry Cotton (2010) and Iron Cross (2011).

Early life 
Mónica Cruz was born in the working-class town of Alcobendas, Madrid, Spain, the daughter of Encarna Sánchez, a hairdresser, and Eduardo Cruz (d. 2015), a retailer and auto mechanic. Throughout her childhood, she lived in Alcobendas. She is the middle child of three; older sister Penélope is an actress, and younger brother Eduardo (born 1986) is a singer. Her parents divorced in 1999, and her father remarried Carmen Moreno in 2003. Moreno gave birth to a girl, Salma Cruz, on 24 February 2012. Penélope and Mónica distinguished themselves as promising young dancers and both received professional training; Penélope attended Spain's National Conservatory while Mónica enrolled in The Royal Academy of Dance to study traditional ballet and flamenco.

Career 
Upon graduating from the academy, Cruz joined Joaquín Cortés' flamenco dance company. She stayed with the company for seven years until, in 2002, she left dancing to pursue a career in acting. In 2005, she starred in the Spanish television show Un Paso Adelante alongside Beatriz Luengo, Miguel Ángel Muñoz, Pablo Puyol and Silvia Marty. She portrayed Tabitha in the historical drama film The Inquiry (2006). Cruz landed the role of Detective Rosa Mulero in the crime drama film Last Hour (2008) alongside DMX and Paul Sorvino. She also appeared in films Asterix at the Olympic Games (2008), All Inclusive (2008), Jerry Cotton (2010) and Iron Cross (2011).

In 2010, her sister Penélope was pregnant while filming scenes for Pirates of the Caribbean: On Stranger Tides. Towards the latter half of shooting, her pregnancy was quite apparent, so the filmmakers devised creative methods of shooting around it. Due to her strong resemblance to Penélope, Cruz was hired to stand-in for the wider-angle footage, while Penélope was featured in the close up shots, where her visage was most discernable. In 2012, she appeared in a television commercial for the video game New Super Mario Bros. 2.

In 2017, Cruz appeared in the music video for British band Jamiroquai's "Cloud 9" from their album Automaton. She also took part in Spanish television series Velvet Colección, where she plays Carmela Cortés, a gypsy flamenco dancer. She shot the second season at the end of 2018. In 2021, Cruz had a guest role as Irene in the Spanish comedy television series La que se avecina.

Fashion and modelling 
In 2007, Cruz and her sister designed a 25-piece Urban and Evening wear collection for Spanish clothing retailer Mango. The sisters have previously designed a collection of jewelry and handbags for Japanese fashion house Samantha Thavasa. Cruz and her sister created two collections for Swiss retailer Charles Vögele in 2010 and 2011. The Spring/Summer 2011 collection, titled "Biaggini Violett" became available in Europe and included denim shorts, striped tops, blazers and dresses. The pair teamed up again 2013 to design a lingerie line titled L'Agent for British lingerie retailer Agent Provocateur. She also modelled for Agent Provocateur's Autumn/Winter 2012–13 campaign. In November 2012, the sisters signed a three-year endorsement deal with Spanish luxury fashion house Loewe, and appeared in advertising campaigns and designed a handbag for the brand. In 2018, she launched a jewellery collection titled "Rock Star" for Majorica. Part of the proceeds from sales of the Rock Star collection benefited the Fero Foundation, a private foundation that helps the development of cancer research.

Cruz has graced the cover of several international fashion magazines, including Mexico's Cosmopolitan and Vanidades; Spain's Elle, Mujerhoy, Women's Health and Glamour and Holland's L'Officiel. In July 2019, Cruz was a cover girl and guest editor for Baszari Journal's Haute Summer Special issue. She has appeared in advertisements for Betsson, Nescafe, Gabriella Vivaldi, TechnoMarine, Once, Hokana sunglasses, Majorica jewelry and Kypers eyewear.

Personal life 

She gave birth to her first child, Antonella Cruz Sánchez, on 14 May 2013. Her daughter was conceived via artificial insemination and has no legal father.

Cruz loves flamenco dancing, saying "dancing is my first passion. It teaches a wonderful discipline and that discipline stays with you. My sister and I talk all the time about how much it has helped us."

Filmography

Awards and nominations

References

External links 

 

1977 births
Living people
21st-century Spanish actresses
Actresses from the Community of Madrid
People from Alcobendas
Spanish female dancers
Spanish film actresses
Spanish television actresses